Sloten may refer to:
 Sloten, Friesland, a city in the municipality of Gaasterlân-Sleat, Netherlands
 Sloten, Amsterdam, a village in the municipality of Amsterdam, North Holland, Netherlands

See also
 Nieuw Sloten, a neighborhood of Amsterdam, Netherlands